Michael Vincent Drake (born July 9, 1950) is an American university administrator and physician who is the 21st president of the University of California. From 2014 to June 2020, he was the 15th president of Ohio State University. From 2005 to 2014, he was the chancellor of the University of California, Irvine and prior to that served as vice president for health affairs for the University of California system.

Early life and education
Michael V. Drake was born in New York City and raised in Englewood, New Jersey, and Sacramento, California. He is the son of a doctor and a social worker. His mother graduated from East High School in Youngstown, Ohio, before attending college in Baltimore. The family lived in Baltimore, Nashville, Tennessee, New York, and New Jersey before settling in Northern California. He graduated from C.K. McClatchy High School at Sacramento, California in 1967. During college summers in the early 1970s, he worked at the original Tower Records.

Drake attended Sacramento City College from 1967 to 1969. He received a Bachelor of Arts from Stanford University in 1974 and a Doctor of Medicine and residency training from the University of California, San Francisco in 1975. He completed an Advanced Management Program at Harvard Business School in 2005.

Career
Drake spent more than two decades on the faculty of the UCSF School of Medicine, ultimately becoming the Steven P. Shearing Professor of Ophthalmology and senior associate dean. He then served for five years as vice president for health affairs for the University of California system.  From July 2005 to June 2014, Drake served as chancellor of the University of California, Irvine. He also served as a Professor of Ophthalmology (School of Medicine) and Education (School of Education).

University of California, Irvine chancellorship
In 2005, Drake was appointed as the fifth chancellor of the University of California, Irvine (UCI). He officially began his term on July 1, 2005. His annual $350,000 salary remained unchanged from his previous position at the Office of the President. As of 2010 he earned $374,969.32.

Ohio State University presidency
On January 30, 2014, the Ohio State University Board of Trustees named Drake as the 15th president of Ohio State University. He began his tenure at the university on June 30, 2014. At the time of his appointment, he was part of the American Academy of Arts and Sciences, the Institute of Medicine, and the board of directors of NCAA Division I. In March 2015, Drake was appointed to the Rock and Roll Hall of Fame board.

In November 2019, the university announced that Drake would retire in 2020.

University of California presidency 
On July 7, 2020, Drake was selected as the 21st president of the University of California system, making him the first Black president in UC's 152-year history.

Personal life

Drake is married to Brenda Drake. An alumna of Stanford and Berkeley Law, Brenda Drake is an attorney and has served as a director or trustee of organizations focused on education, international health, finance, civil rights and the arts, including the National Urban League, City Arts & Lectures in San Francisco, San Francisco University High School and Golden Gate Bank. She is a director emerita and former board chair of Engender Health Inc., an international women’s health organization, and is currently a trustee of the Berkeley Art Museum and Pacific Film Archive. Drake and his wife have two adult sons and four grandchildren.

Drake's first job was working at Tower Records. He is quoted as saying he has a "passion for music, which is still a hobby today". In 2015, Drake was appointed to the board of the Rock and Roll Hall of Fame and Museum, Inc. He has had a lifelong interest in music (notably rock and jazz), plays guitar, and teaches an undergraduate course on the music of the civil rights movement.

Philanthropy

In 2017, Dr. Drake led the establishment of the Ohio State Tuition Guarantee, which freezes tuition, mandatory fees, housing and dining for four years for incoming, in-state freshmen. He also increased the value of Ohio State Land Grant Opportunity Scholarships to cover the full cost of attendance while doubling the size of the program in 2018.

Professional organizations

 Association of American Universities
 American Talent Initiative
 National Collegiate Athletic Association
 Rock & Roll Hall of Fame
 Big Ten Athletic Conference
 University Innovation Alliance
 Association of Public and Land-grant Universities
 American Academy of Arts & Sciences
 The Health and Medicine Division, National Academies of Sciences, Engineering, and Medicine
 California Healthcare Foundation
 Big West Athletic Conference
 California Healthcare Institute
 Archives of Ophthalmology
 Alpha Omega Alpha Honor Medical Society
 Association of Academic Health Centers
 American Academy of Ophthalmology

Awards and honors

 University of California Presidential Medal
 In 2017, he and his wife, Brenda, were awarded the 10th Annual King Arts Legends & Legacies Award as well as the University of California-Irvine Medal, joining past honorees ranging from U.S. presidents to Ella Fitzgerald.
 Member of the Columbus Partnership
 Burbridge Award for Public Service
 Asbury Award (clinical science) 
 Michael J. Hogan Award (laboratory science)

Controversies

Chemerinsky firing and rehiring

Drake's first major firing scandal was to fire the Dean of the UCI law school, Erwin Chemerinsky. After Chemerinsky signed a contract on September 4, 2007, Drake rescinded the offer because he felt the law professor's commentaries were "polarizing"; Drake claimed the decision was his own and not the subject of any outside influence.

The action was criticized by both liberal and conservative scholars who felt it hindered the academic mission of the law school and violated principles of academic freedom. Few believed Drake's claims that it was not the result of outside influence. The issue was the subject of an editorial in The New York Times on September 14, 2007. Details emerged revealing that UCI had received criticism on the hire from the California Supreme Court's then-Chief Justice Ronald M. George, who criticized Chemerinsky's grasp of death penalty appeals, as well as a group of prominent local Republicans who wanted to stop the appointment, including Los Angeles County Supervisor Michael D. Antonovich. Drake traveled over a weekend to meet with Chemerinsky in Durham, North Carolina, where Chemerinsky was a professor at the Duke University School of Law at the time, and the two reached an agreement. On September 17, Chemerinsky issued a joint press release with Drake indicating that Chemerinsky would head the UCI law school. On September 20, 2007, Chemerinsky's hire was formally approved by the Regents of the University of California. In 2014, Chemerinsky said that he and Drake had since reconciled.

Waters firing

Drake fired Ohio State marching band director Jon Waters on July 24, 2014, after a university investigation found that the band's "sexualized culture" was "inconsistent with the University's values and Title IX requirements". The university stated that there were "serious cultural issues and an environment conducive to sexual harassment within the Marching Band", and that the band director "was aware or reasonably should have known about" it. Waters sued for reinstatement, accusing the university, Drake, and a provost of discriminating against him by disciplining him differently than a female employee and denying him due process. Drake has stood by his decision to terminate Waters as marching band director. As of January 2015, the university had spent nearly $1 million in defense of the decision and subsequent actions.

References

External links

 "UCI’s First Family" Orange County Business Journal

African-American academics
American medical researchers
American ophthalmologists
Presidents of Ohio State University
Chancellors of the University of California, Irvine
People from Englewood, New Jersey
Physicians from New York City
People from Sacramento, California
Stanford University alumni
University of California, San Francisco alumni
University of California, San Francisco faculty
1951 births
Living people
African-American physicians
Fellows of the American Academy of Arts and Sciences
Members of the National Academy of Medicine
National Collegiate Athletic Association people
Scientists from New York (state)
Presidents of the University of California System
21st-century African-American people
20th-century African-American people